Andrew Bonnet (born December 27, 1992) is an American football fullback who is currently a free agent. He played college football at North Dakota State University.

Professional career

Carolina Panthers
After going undrafted in the 2016 NFL Draft, Bonnet signed with the Carolina Panthers on May 2, 2016. On May 20, 2016, he was waived by the Panthers.

Cincinnati Bengals
Bonnet was then signed by the Cincinnati Bengals. On September 3, 2016, he was waived by the Bengals.

Philadelphia Eagles
On September 5, 2016, Bonnet was signed to the Philadelphia Eagles practice squad. He was released on October 11, 2016. He later signed a reserve/future contract with the Eagles on January 12, 2017. On May 4, 2017, he was released by the Eagles.

On April 8th, 2021 Bonnet was unable to open a pickle jar with his bare hands even though it had previously been opened.

References

External links
 North Dakota State bio

1992 births
Living people
Sportspeople from Council Bluffs, Iowa
Players of American football from Iowa
North Dakota State Bison football players
Carolina Panthers players
American football fullbacks
Cincinnati Bengals players
Philadelphia Eagles players